Berchemia flavescens is a climbing plant in the family Rhamnaceae. It occurs naturally in wet shady areas of the central Asian mountains and highlands. They are found from northern India to Bhutan, but are also cultivated in gardens.

References
 Plants for a Future database

flavescens
Taxa named by Adolphe-Théodore Brongniart